This is the list of the characters from the comic strip and comic book Little Lulu.

Main characters
 Little Lulu Moppet – The main character and Tubby and Annie's best friend. She is very smart, but stubborn and always initiates a battle with the boys to show that the girls are as good as them. Lulu is also very creative and tells stories to Alvin to teach him a lesson with fun. She wears a red dress and hat and has long black curly hair. In the Little Lulu theatrical shorts she was voiced by Cecil Roy. In The Little Lulu Show she was voiced by Tracey Ullman (Season 1 only) and Jane Woods (Seasons 2 and 3 only).
 Tubby Tompkins – Lulu's male best friend and her chief opponent in their disputes. He is the leader of the boys's club known as "The Fellers". He is relapsed and always forgets to pay the monthly fee or to fulfill the obligations and his clubmates often take him out of office. He's in love with Gloria, but she's rarely given him a chance, although he never stops trying to win her heart. He has red hair and wears a white sailor's hat, a black collared shirt and light brown/orange pants, making his outfit very similar to a sailor's uniform. His nature as a fat boy earned him his nickname Tubby. In the Little Lulu theatrical shorts he was voiced by Arnold Stang. In The Little Lulu Show he was voiced by Bruce Dinsmore.
 Annie Inch – Lulu's female best friend who is involved in most of Lulu's escapades and adventures. She isn't as smart, but she is a true friend who helps Lulu in her plans. Sometimes she is annoyed at everyone for no reason. Annie is Iggy's sister. She has short black straight hair and wears a blue dress (in the earlier years she wore a yellow dress). In The Little Lulu Show she was voiced by Michael Caloz (Seasons 1 and 2 only) and Vanessa Lengies (Season 3 only).
 Iggy Inch – Tubby's male best friend and a member of the "Fellers". He is grumpy, mischievous and always doing tricks. Iggy is Annie's brother. He has a shaved head, and wears a white collar shirt and orange pants (in the early years, he wore an orange collared shirt and blue pants). In The Little Lulu Show he was voiced by Dawn Ford. 
 Willie Wilkins – One of Tubby's friends and the strongest member of the "Fellers". He has short black hair and wears an orange cap, a green shirt and orange knickers (in the early years, he wore a brown cap, a red shirt and gray knickers). In The Little Lulu Show he was voiced by Andrew Henry (Seasons 1 and 2 only) and Ricky Mabe (Season 3 only).
 Eddie Stimson – One of Tubby's friends and the smartest member of the "Fellers". He often creates the boys' plans against the West Side Boys. While one of the main characters of both the comic and TV series, Eddie plays a much more minor role in the anime series, appearing in only 5 episodes with no lines. He has short light blond hair and wears a blue whoopee cap, a red shirt and blue pants. In The Little Lulu Show he was voiced by Justin Bradley (Seasons 1-2 only) and Michael Yarmush (Season 3 only).
 Wilbur Van Snobbe – The richest and most charming boy in town. He likes to be loved by the girls, but he is arrogant and petulant, being sweet only with Gloria. Wilbur has no friends, although he sometimes plays with the other kids. In the TV series however, he is portrayed as being less arrogant and more likeable amongst the other kids (though occasionally prone to being antagonistic) and in the anime series, he is even portrayed as being part of the "Fellers". He has curly blond hair and wears a purple suit (in the early years, he had red hair and a blue suit). He speaks Snobby American with an Snobby American accent. In The Little Lulu Show he was voiced by Jacob Tierney.
 Gloria Goode Darling – The most beautiful girl in town. She is kind and playful with the girls, who adore her and the boys, who fall in love with her. In the TV series, Gloria is seen as one of Lulu's friends rather than a rival. She is richer than most of the class, although less than Wilbur. She has long, wavy blonde hair and wears a ruffled pink dress. In The Little Lulu Show she was voiced by Angelina Boivin.
 Alvin Jones – Lulu's 6-year-old neighbor. He is mischievous, bratty and only stops tantrums when Lulu tells a story. He has red hair with a quiff and wears a white shirt and blue overalls. In The Little Lulu Show he was voiced by Ajay Fry (Seasons 1 and 2 only) and Jonathan Koensgen (Season 3 only).
 Mrs. Martha and Mr. George Moppets (Lulu's Mom and Dad) – Lulu's parents. She's a great cook. He always is targeted by Tubby's pursuit as a detective. In The Little Lulu Show they are voiced by Sonja Ball and Gary Jewell.
 Mrs. Ellie and Mr. Jim Tompkins (Tubby's Mom and Dad) – Tubby's parents. In The Little Lulu Show they are voiced by Susan Glover and Walter Massey.
 The West Side Boys – A gang of stronger, tougher bully boys from across town who are the rival club of the "Fellers" and always try to invade their club. The most frequently seen of the West Side Boys are Butch (the leader), Mickey and Spike, while other individual members include Mike, Slug, Junior and Guggy. They are voiced by Michael Yarmush, Justin Bradley and Bruce Dinsmore.

Supporting characters
 Marge – One of Lulu's friends. She is smart and helps Lulu in her plans against the boys. She falls in love with Eddie, but never told anyone. She has short light brown hair and wears a yellow dress. In The Little Lulu Show she was also voiced by Angelina Boivin.
 Jeannie and Joannie – Identical twin sisters and 2 of Lulu's friends. They think the same and always complete each other's sentences. They both have long curly light brown hair and wear white shirts with orange overalls. In The Little Lulu Show they are voiced by Danielle Desormeaux.
 Janie – One of Lulu's friends. She has long auburn hair with pigtail braids and wears a light blue dress. She was also voiced by Angelina Boivin.
 Miss Feeny – The kids's school teacher, who can never discipline them. In The Little Lulu Show she was voiced by Ellen David.
 Poor Little Girl – The main character of the stories that Lulu tells to Alvin, who is always in trouble. She always resembles Lulu, only with a tattered and patched dress.
 Witch Hazel and Little Itch –The witches (aunt and niece) of the stories that Lulu tells to Alvin.
 Cranberry – Wilbur's butler. He speaks English with an English accent. He was also voiced by Bruce Dinsmore.
 Mr. and Mrs. Van Snobbe (Wilbur's Mom and Dad) – Wilbur's parents. His mother speaks Victorian with an Victorian accent. They are investors of the stock exchange and millionaires. In The Little Lulu Show they are voiced by Sonja Ball and Terrence Scammell.
 Mr. and Mrs. Inch (Annie and Iggy's Mom and Dad) – Annie and Iggy's parents. The mother is Martha's best friend and a good cook, though she always tests new recipes. They are voiced by Pauline Little and Terrence Scammell.
 Mr. Ernest: – The school's principal. 
 Officer McNab – One of the district's truant officers. He speaks Irish with an Irish accent. In The Little Lulu Show he was voiced by Terrence Scammell.
 Sammi – A martian and the leader of the Little Men, who appear only in the Tubby comics. He always comes to earth to ask for help from Tubby in some trouble, but always helps him in return. 
 Chubby Tompkins – Tubby's lookalike cousin (except he is smaller). Tubby hates his visits and tries to hide.

Minor characters
 Cedric James – Alvin's baby brother.
 Kathy Crowe – Alvin's only friend at school.
 Al – The owner of the Sunset Diner. He gives Tubby stale pies.
 Miss Cleff Myster – Tubby's violin teacher. She was also voiced by Pauline Little.
 Mr. and Mrs. James or Jones – Alvin's and Cedric's parents. Mrs. Jones (Marge and Alvin's Mom) was voiced by Kate Hutchison.
 Grandpa Feeb or McFeeb – Annie and Iggy's grandfather, who is becoming deaf and forgetting things.
 Ada – A slightly overweight girl and Lulu's friend who is only seen in the earlier comics.
 Bernie – A bad boy who becomes Lulu's friend when she discovers that he is a sweet boy under the bully image. He appears rarely. He was also voiced by Andrew Henry.
 Suzy – A girl with pigtails and Lulu's friend. She appears rarely. She was also voiced by Angelina Boivin.
 Freddie – An ugly boy who falls in love with Lulu. He appears rarely.
 Gertie Green Bean – Lulu's friend who lives in a trailer traveling the country with her mother. She spends a time in town and gets into fights with Wilbur. In The Little Lulu Show she was also voiced by Angelina Boivin.
 Fifi – A French girl who befriends Lulu when she travels to Paris. She speaks French with a French accent.
 Gregory Gallant – One of the minor male characters in the TV Series. A well-known male child star, the protagonist of "Rich Little Poor Boy". In reality, he has an obnoxious, egotistic and self-centered attitude and is rude towards his fans (especially the girls). He gets a taste of his own medicine post-show after chasing Lulu out of the show's venue, stumbling and ending up falling on Lulu's feet due to being tripped by Tubby. He was also voiced by Ricky Mabe.
 Marilyn – A female child star. She is the leading lady of "Rich Little Poor Boy", the on-screen partner of Gregory Gallant; In the TV Series episode entitled, "Tiny Tot's Syrup", she replies to Lulu during an audition, "Oh, Please... I'm a professional." She was also voiced by Angelina Boivin.
 Marty the Midget – A notorious criminal who escaped prison after exchanging identities with Tubby. He is soon captured when Lulu outwitted his antics. He has the same voice as Binky from Arthur. He was also voiced by Bruce Dinsmore.

Notes

See also
 Little Lulu and Her Little Friends
 The Little Lulu Show

Lists of characters in American television animation
Characters
American comics characters